The 2018 United States attorney general elections were held on November 6, 2018, in 30 states, 2 territories, and the District of Columbia. The previous attorney general elections for this group of states took place in 2014, except in Vermont where attorneys general serve only two-year terms and elected their current attorney general in 2016.

The elections took place concurrently with elections to the House of Representatives and Senate, and numerous state and local elections including governorships.

Democrats gained 4 elected attorney general offices, Republicans gained zero offices. This caused Democratic attorneys general to constitute a majority of elected attorneys general in U.S. states.

Statistics

Closest races 
States where the margin of victory was under 1%:

 Nevada, 0.4% (4,533 votes)
 Wisconsin, 0.6% (17,190 votes)

States where the margin of victory was between 1% and 5%:

 Georgia, 2.6% (100,756 votes)
 Michigan, 2.7% (115,000 votes)
 Arizona, 3.4% (80,672 votes)
 Texas, 3.6% (295,109 votes)
 Minnesota, 3.9% (98,948 votes)
 Ohio, 4.4% (187,847 votes)

States where the margin of victory was between 5% and 10%:

 Florida, 6.0% (487,620 votes)
Connecticut, 6.0% (81,980 votes)
 Colorado, 6.5% (160,707 votes)

Blue denotes offices won by Democrats; red denotes those won by Republicans.

Partisan control of statewide offices

Alabama 

The 2018 Alabama Attorney General election was held on November 6, 2018, to elect the Attorney General of Alabama.

Former Alabama Attorney General Troy King unsuccessfully sought the Republican nomination. Incumbent Republican Attorney General Steve Marshall, who was appointed by Governor Bentley in February 2017 after appointing Attorney General Luther Strange to the U.S. Senate, ran for a first full term. Former chief deputy attorney general Alice Martin sought the Republican nomination. Attorney Joseph Siegelman, son of former governor Don Siegelman, is the nominee of the Democratic Party. Chris Christie ran for attorney general on the Democratic ballot. Christie has been a trial lawyer at Bradley Arant Boult Cummings for 30 years.

Republican primary

Runoff

Democratic primary

General election

Arizona 

The 2018 Arizona Attorney General election was held on November 6, 2018, to elect the attorney general of Arizona.

Incumbent Mark Brnovich was re-elected to a second term.

Republican primary

Democratic primary

General election

Arkansas 

The 2018 Arkansas Attorney General election was held on November 6, 2018, to elect the attorney general of Arkansas.

Republican Attorney General Leslie Rutledge was elected to a second term.

General election

California 

The 2018 California Attorney General election was held on November 6, 2018, to elect the attorney general of California.

2014 election winner Kamala Harris was elected to the United States Senate during the 2016 Senate elections; incumbent Democratic Attorney General Xavier Becerra won election to a full term.

Primary election

General election

Colorado 

The 2018 Colorado Attorney General election was held on November 6, 2018, to elect the attorney general of Colorado.

Incumbent Republican attorney general Cynthia Coffman ran for governor, but was eliminated at the state Republican party convention in April.

Republican primary

Democratic primary

General election

Connecticut 

The 2018 Connecticut Attorney General election was held on November 6, 2018, to elect the attorney general of Connecticut.

Incumbent Attorney General George Jepsen did not seek re-election. Democratic nominee William Tong defeated Republican nominee Susan Hatfield.

Republican primary

Democratic primary

General election

Delaware 

The 2018 Delaware Attorney General election took place on November 6, 2018. The Delaware primary election for federal and state candidates took place on September 6, 2018. Incumbent Attorney General Matthew Denn announced on August 28, 2017, that he would not seek re-election.

Democratic primary

General election

Florida 

The 2018 Florida Attorney General election took place on November 6, 2018, to elect the attorney general of Florida. Incumbent Republican Attorney General Pam Bondi was term-limited and could not seek re-election to a third consecutive term.

Republican candidate Ashley Moody defeated Democrat Sean Shaw, with the election being called after 93% of the precincts reporting. Moody won by about 6 percentage points, which was the widest margin of any Florida statewide race in 2018.

Republican primary

Democratic primary

General election

Georgia 

{{Infobox election
| election_name = 2018 Georgia Attorney General election
| country = Georgia (U.S. state)
| type = presidential
| ongoing = no
| previous_election = 2014 Georgia Attorney General election
| previous_year = 2014
| next_election = 2022 Georgia Attorney General election
| next_year = 2022
| election_date = November 6, 2018
| image_size = 160x180px
| image1 = 
| nominee1 = Chris Carr
| party1 = Republican Party (United States)
| popular_vote1 = 1,981,563
| percentage1 = 51.30%
| image2 = 
| nominee2 = Charlie Bailey
| party2 = Democratic Party (United States)
| popular_vote2 = 1,880,807
| percentage2 = 48.70%
| map_image = Georgia Attorney General, 2018.svg
| map_size = 200px
| map_caption = County resultsCarr:    Bailey:    
| title = Attorney General of Georgia
| before_election = Sam Olens
| before_party = Republican Party (United States)
| after_election = Chris Carr
| after_party = Republican Party (United States)
}}
The 2018 Georgia Attorney General election took place on November 6, 2018, to elect the attorney general of Georgia.

Incumbent Republican Attorney General Sam Olens resigned to become president of Kennesaw State University effective November 1, 2016, with Georgia Department of Economic Development Commissioner Christopher M. "Chris" Carr being appointed to serve the remainder of the term. Carr will be eligible to run for election to a full term in 2018.

Potential Republican candidates include State Senator Josh McKoon and former state representative B.J. Pak.

Potential Democratic candidates included State Representative Stacey Evans and former Georgia Judicial Qualifications Commission Chair Lester Tate.  2010 nominee and former Dougherty County District Attorney Ken Hodges was considered a potential candidate, but has decided to run for a seat on the Georgia Court of Appeals instead. Columbus Mayor Teresa Tomlinson had ruled out running for attorney general. As of July 2018, Charlie Bailey, former Senior Assistant District Attorney in the Fulton County District Attorney's office, was running.

 Republican primary 

 Democratic primary 

 General election 

 Idaho 

The 2018 Idaho Attorney General election took place on November 6, 2018, to elect the attorney general of Idaho.

Incumbent Republican Attorney General Lawrence Wasden announced on September 7, 2017, that he will run for re-election to a fifth term.

 Republican primary 

 Democratic primary 

 General election 

 Illinois 

The 2018 Illinois Attorney General election took place on November 6, 2018, to elect the attorney general of Illinois.

Incumbent Democratic Attorney General Lisa Madigan, who had served since 2003, did not seek re-election to a fifth term. Democrat Kwame Raoul won the election with 55 percent of the vote, while Republican Erika Harold took 43 percent of the vote.

 Republican primary 

 Democratic primary 

 General election 

 Iowa 
The 2018 Iowa Attorney General election took place on November 6, 2018, to elect the attorney general of Iowa.

Incumbent Democratic Attorney General Tom Miller won re-election with 76.5% of the vote. The Republican Party did not nominate anyone, but the Libertarian Party nominated Marco Battaglia.

 Democratic primary 

 General election 

 Kansas 

The 2018 Kansas Attorney General election took place on November 6, 2018, to elect the attorney general of Kansas.

Incumbent Attorney General Derek Schmidt won re-election with 59 percent of the vote, defeating Democratic challenger Sarah Swain.

 Republican primary 

 Democratic primary 

 General election 

 Maryland 

The Maryland Attorney General election of 2018 was held on November 6, 2018, to elect the attorney general of Maryland.

Incumbent Democratic Attorney General Brian Frosh was eligible to seek a second term in office, filed for re-election on February 15, 2018, and was unopposed for the Democratic nomination. Republican former prosecutor and trade group CEO Craig Wolf was unopposed for the Republican nomination. Brian Frosh won with 64.8% of the vote.

 Republican primary 

 Democratic primary 

 General election 

 Massachusetts 

The Massachusetts Attorney General election of 2018 was held on November 6, 2018, to elect the attorney general of Massachusetts.

Incumbent Democratic Attorney General Maura Healey won re-election to a second consecutive term. Healey was a speculative candidate for Governor but declined to run.

 Republican primary 

 

 General election 

 

 Michigan 

The Michigan Attorney General election of 2018 took place on November 6, 2018.

This race occurred alongside elections to elect Michigan's governor, Class I United States Senator, secretary of state, as well as elections for Michigan's 14 seats in the United States House of Representatives, all 38 seats in the Michigan Senate and all 110 seats in the Michigan House of Representatives. Incumbent Republican Attorney General Bill Schuette was prohibited from seeking a third term due to term limits and unsuccessfully ran for governor of Michigan instead. The Michigan GOP was unsuccessful in looking to win its 5th straight attorney general election. Along with the offices of lieutenant governor and secretary of state, the nominees for attorney general were chosen by party delegates at their respective party conventions.

Nessel defeated Leonard by 115,000 votes, becoming the first Democratic attorney general of Michigan since 2003, when Jennifer Granholm left office to become governor.

 General election 

 Minnesota 

The 2018 Minnesota Attorney General election was held on November 6, 2018, to elect the attorney general of the U.S. state of Minnesota.

A primary election was held on August 14, 2018, in which Doug Wardlow was nominated as the Republican candidate and Keith Ellison was nominated as the Democratic–Farmer–Labor (DFL) candidate. Ellison won the election.

 Republican primary 

 Democratic–Farmer–Labor primary 

 General election 

 Nebraska 

The 2018 Nebraska Attorney General election was held on November 6, 2018, to elect the attorney general of the U.S. state of Nebraska.

Incumbent Republican attorney general Doug Peterson ran for re-election to a second term. Omaha attorney Evangelos Argyrakis, ran in the Democratic primary. However, after being charged with felony strangulation following an altercation with his 82-year-old father on April 8, 2018, Nebraska Democratic Party called on him to step aside, which he did on June 25, 2018. This left Peterson running unopposed in the general election.

 Republican primary 

 Democratic primary 

 General election 

 Nevada 

The 2018 Nevada Attorney General election was held on November 6, 2018, to elect the attorney general of the U.S. state of Nevada.

Incumbent Republican Attorney General Adam Laxalt did not run for re-election to a second term and instead ran unsuccessfully for governor.

 Republican primary 

 Democratic primary 

 General election 

 New Mexico 

The 2018 New Mexico Attorney General election was held on November 6, 2018, to elect the attorney general of the U.S. state of New Mexico.

Incumbent Democratic Attorney General Hector Balderas ran for re-election to a second term.

 Republican primary 

 Democratic primary 

 Libertarian primary 

 General election 

 New York 

The 2018 New York Attorney General election took place on November 6, 2018.

New York City Public Advocate Letitia James, a Democrat, was elected. James is the first woman and the first African-American to be elected New York attorney general.

Former Attorney General Eric Schneiderman resigned on May 8, 2018, after allegations of domestic abuse and withdrew from his then-ongoing reelection campaign. Incumbent Solicitor General Barbara Underwood was chosen by the Legislature to complete her unexpired term, but opted not to seek election to a full term.

On September 13, 2018, James won the Democratic nomination for attorney general, defeating Leecia Eve, former senior policy advisor to U.S. Senator Hillary Clinton; Sean Patrick Maloney, U.S. Representative for New York's 18th congressional district; and Zephyr Teachout, professor at Fordham University School of Law. In the general election, James defeated Republican Party candidate Keith Wofford with over 60% of the vote.

In the general election, James carried every county won by Andrew Cuomo in the concurrent gubernatorial election as well as Franklin, Clinton, Essex, Orange, Duchess, Columbia, Broome, Cortland and Schenectady counties.

 Democratic primary 

Turnout: 28.08%

 Reform primary 

 General election 
 

 North Dakota 

The 2018 North Dakota Attorney General election took place on November 6, 2018, to elect the Attorney General of North Dakota.

Incumbent Republican Attorney General Wayne Stenehjem won re-election against his Democratic-NPL challenger, trial attorney David Thompson.

 Primary election 
 

 General election 
 

 Ohio 

The 2018 Ohio Attorney General election took place on November 6, 2018, to elect the Attorney General of Ohio.

Incumbent Republican Attorney General Mike DeWine was term-limited and cannot run for a third term as attorney general. DeWine instead ran for governor.

 Republican primary 

 Democratic primary 

 General election 

 Oklahoma 

The 2018 Oklahoma Attorney General election took place on November 6, 2018, to elect the attorney general of Oklahoma.

Incumbent Republican attorney general Scott Pruitt was term-limited and could not run for a third term. Pruitt resigned on February 17, 2017, upon being confirmed as Administrator of the Environmental Protection Agency.

 Republican primary 

 Runoff 

 General election 

 Rhode Island 

The 2018 Rhode Island Attorney General election took place on November 6, 2018, to elect the attorney general of Rhode Island.

Incumbent Democratic Attorney General Peter Kilmartin was term-limited and could not run for re-election to a third term in office.

 Democratic primary 

 General election 

 South Carolina 

The 2018 South Carolina Attorney General election took place on November 6, 2018, to elect the attorney general of South Carolina.

Incumbent Republican Attorney General Alan Wilson won re-election to a third term.

Other Republican candidates included State Representative Todd Atwater, like Wilson, from Lexington  and Greenville attorney William Herlong.

 Republican primary 

 Runoff 

 General election 

 South Dakota 

The 2018 South Dakota attorney general election was held on November 6, 2018.

Incumbent Attorney General Marty Jackley was term-limited and ran for governor of South Dakota. In June 2018, the South Dakota Republican party nominated Jason Ravnsborg for attorney general and the Democratic party nominated Randy Seiler. Ravnsborg won the election to become the 31st attorney general of South Dakota.

 Republican convention 

 General election 

 Texas 

The 2018 Texas Attorney General election took place on November 6, 2018, to elect the attorney general of Texas.

Incumbent Republican Attorney General Ken Paxton won re-election to a second term.

 Republican primary 

 Democratic primary 

 General election 

 Vermont 

The 2018 Vermont Attorney General election took place on November 6, 2018, to elect the attorney general of Vermont.

Incumbent Democratic Attorney General T. J. Donovan (since 2017) was elected to a second term.

 Republican primary 

 Democratic primary 

 General election 

 Wisconsin 

The 2018 Wisconsin Attorney General election took place on November 6, 2018, to elect the attorney general of Wisconsin.

Republican incumbent Brad Schimel, first elected in 2014, ran for re-election to a second term.  Voting rights attorney and former federal prosecutor Josh Kaul, the Democratic nominee, defeated Schimel in the general election. Terry Larson, the Constitution Party nominee, also garnered around 2% of the vote, greater than the vote difference between Schimel and Kaul.

 General election 

 Territories and federal district 
 District of Columbia 

The 2018 District of Columbia Attorney General election was held on November 6, 2018, to elect the attorney general of Washington, D.C. This was the second ever attorney general election in D.C. history.

Incumbent attorney general Democrat Karl Racine handily won re-election.

 General election 

 Guam 
The 2018 Guam Attorney General election was held on November 6, 2018, to elect the attorney general of Guam.

In a primary election on August 25, 2018, Leevin Camacho garnered the most votes (nearly 50%) despite accusations of inexperience from his opponents. He went on to win the general election against Douglas Moylan in November.

 Primary election 

 General election 

 Northern Mariana Islands 
The 2018 Northern Mariana Islands Attorney General election''' was held on November 6, 2018, to elect the attorney general of the Northern Mariana Islands.

Democratic incumbent Edward Manibusan won re-election with one-hundred percent of the vote as a nonpartisan candidate.

General election

Notes

References